The Best of Dizzy Mizz Lizzy is a greatest hits album released by the Danish rock band Dizzy Mizz Lizzy in 2002. The first disc contains tracks from the band's two studio albums Dizzy Mizz Lizzy and Rotator, the second disc holds a live registration of a concert held in Aarhus on 11 May 1996. After its release, it immediately reached gold status.

Track listing

Personnel 
Dizzy Mizz Lizzy
 Tim Christensen – guitar, vocals, songwriter, co-producer, cover art
 Martin Nielsen – bass
 Søren Friis – drums
Production
 Dizzy Mizz Lizzy – arranger, compiler
 Nick Foss – producer
 Lars Overgaard – co-producer, mixer (disc 2)
 Rune Nissen-Petersen – engineer (disc 2)
 Nikolaj Vinten – mastering
 Peter Brander – recorded by (disc 2)
 Dan Christensen – cover art
 Martin Dam Kristensen – photography (disc 2)

References 

2004 greatest hits albums
Albums produced by Nick Foss
Dizzy Mizz Lizzy albums
EMI Records compilation albums